Gruda is a surname. Notable people with the surname include:

Agnès Gruda, Polish-born Canadian journalist and fiction writer
Ayşen Gruda (1944–2019), Turkish actress and comedian
Brajan Gruda (born 2004), German football player
Ildi Gruda (born 1999), Albanian football player
Mirsad Gruda (born 1986), Albanian football player
Sandrine Gruda (born 1987), French basketball player
Suad Gruda (born 1991), Macedonian-born Swedish football player
Yılmaz Gruda (born 1930), Turkish actor, poet, playwright, and translator

Surnames of Albanian origin